XIXA is an American rock band from Tucson, Arizona. Allmusic describes their music as "a form of blues indebted to the desert, mixed in with their Latin roots and a dose of gothic horror.".

History
Brian Lopez and Gabriel Sullivan founded a group called Chicha Dust which eventually became XIXA, releasing its first album, an eight-track live EP, in 2013. Both Lopez and Sullivan had previously played in the group Giant Sand. The group's name references chicha, a Peruvian style of music indebted to both cumbia and psychedelic rock.

Following the debut EP, Shift and Shadow, the group released a full-length album Bloodline in 2016, and toured the United States and Europe. A four-song EP called The Code arrived in 2019. Genesis, a second full-length, arrived in 2021.

Members
Brian Lopez - vocals, guitar. 
Gabriel Sullivan - vocals, guitar
Efren Cruz Chavez - percussion
Geoffrey Hidalgo - bass
Hikit Corbel - bass
Jason Urman - keyboards
Winston Watson - drums

Discography
Shift and Shadow (Self-released, 2013)
Bloodline (Barbes Records, 2016)
The Code EP (Self-released, 2019)
Genesis (Barbes, 2021)

References

Rock music groups from Arizona
Musical groups from Tucson, Arizona